Culex annulirostris, commonly known as the common banded mosquito, is an insect native to Australia, Fiji, Micronesia, the Philippines and Indonesia. It is regarded as a serious pest species throughout its range.

Frederick Askew Skuse described the species in 1889 from specimens collected in the Blue Mountains and Berowra. The species name is derived from the Latin words annulus "ring" and rostrum "bill".

The female is a moderate-sized brown to dark brown mosquito, with a single pale prominent broad band on the middle third of its proboscis, and similar bands on its legs.

It closely resembles the female of the related Cx. sitiens. The latter species has a narrower band on its proboscis.

Breeding takes place anywhere there is standing water, from swamps and ponds to all kinds of man-made puddles—irrigation channels, bamboo stumps, cacao shells, the bottoms of canoes. The water can be clean or polluted, in sun or shade, and fresh or brackish.

Culex annulirostris mosquitoes are active between spring and late autumn. During this time they appear most commonly at dusk, though can also be active during the day and indoors. They can travel 5–10 km from their place of birth and feed on mammals and birds. Only the female feeds on blood as it needs to consume protein to help in reproducing. The male drinks nectar.

It is an important vector for a number of arboviruses, including Murray Valley encephalitis virus, Ross River virus, Barmah Forest virus, Kunjin virus and Japanese encephalitis, as well as dog heartworm and the roundworm Wuchereria bancrofti in New Guinea.

There is evidence it carries myxomatosis.

References

External links

 

annulirostris
Insect vectors of human pathogens
Insects described in 1889